Deh-e Parviz Sarani (also Romanized as Deh-e Parvīz Sārānī; also known as Deh-e Parvīz) is a village in Qorqori Rural District, Qorqori District, Hirmand County, Sistan and Baluchestan Province, Iran. At the 2006 census, its population was 26, in 7 families.

References 

Populated places in Hirmand County